A  (plural  "old man; rustic, churl, lout"; Old Irish ) is a trickster or bogeyman figure in Gaelic folklore and mythology.
The  "old man" is paired with the  "hag, old woman" in Irish legend.

Name
 (Old Irish also ) is the Irish word for a tenant, a serf or peasant. 

The word has alternatively been derived from both "cottage, hut" (probably a borrowing from Old Norse, as is English booth).
In either case, the name is formed by the addition of nominal suffix  ("connected or involved with, belonging to, having").

In modern Gaelic,  simply means "old man", often used affectionately.

 is the reconstructed Proto-Celtic form of Old Irish  and an element in the name of the Badacsony wine region in Hungary. The name dates back to at least 1000BC but is likely much older.

In Gaelic folklore 

This identification inspired Lady Gregory's tale "Manannan at Play" (Gods and Fighting Men, 1904), where Manannan makes an appearance in disguise as "a clown ... old striped clothes he had, and puddle water splashing in his shoes, and his sword sticking out naked behind him, and his ears through the old cloak that was over his head, and in his hand he had three spears of hollywood scorched and blackened."

In Scottish folklore the  comes down the chimney to kidnap naughty children, used as a cautionary tale or bogeyman figure to frighten children into good behaviour. In W. B. Yeats's 1903 prose version of The Hour-Glass, the character of the Fool remarks at one point during the play that a  he met upon the roadside attempted to trick him with a riddle into letting the creature near his coin.

References in popular culture
 s are seen at the beginning of Moonshine by Rob Thurman.
 s occasionally appear in Charles de Lint's books of mythic fiction.
 The term  is used to describe shadow-like or "ink like" creatures—invisible to most people—that appear at locations before disasters in the books Odd Thomas, Forever Odd, Brother Odd, Odd Hours, Odd Apocalypse, Odd Interlude, Deeply Odd, and Saint Odd by Dean Koontz. These can be seen only by Odd.
 s appear as evil goblin spearmen, in Alan Garner's fantasy novel The Moon of Gomrath, in which they have shining bald heads, bodies covered in flat locks of hair and the legs of birds.

See also
 Bodak, an undead creature in the Dungeons & Dragons fantasy role-playing game
 Brownie (folklore), a domestic spirit in British folklore
 , a divine hag, a creator deity, a weather deity, and an ancestor deity in Gaelic mythology
 Wirry-cow, a bugbear or demon in Scottish folklore

References

Aos Sí
Fairies
Fantasy creatures
Irish folklore
Irish legendary creatures
Scottish folklore
Scottish legendary creatures
Scottish mythology
Tuatha Dé Danann
Bogeymen
Mythological tricksters